Rodham may refer to:

People

Surname
Members of the Rodham family:
Hillary Rodham Clinton (born 1947), American politician 
Dorothy Howell Rodham (1919–2011), American homemaker and mother of Hillary Clinton
Hugh Ellsworth Rodham (1911–1993), American businessman and father of Hillary Clinton
Hugh Edwin Rodham (born 1950), American lawyer and politician, brother of Hillary Clinton
Tony Rodham (1954–2019), American consultant and businessman, brother of Hillary Clinton
 James Rodham (born 1983), English cricketer
 Morris Rodham, Archdeacon of Warwick in the Diocese of Coventry, England, 2010–2012
 C.H.B. Rodham, commander of the 100th Indian Infantry Brigade in World War II

Given name
 Rodham Kenner, delegate to the Fifth Virginia Convention in 1776
 Rodham E. Tulloss, specialist in fungus species such as Amanita rubrovolvata

Literature
 Rodham (novel), a 2020 novel by Curtis Sittenfeld

See also 
 Rodham, Patel, a parish in Drake County, New South Wales, Australia 
 Roddon (also written "rodham"), the dried raised bed of a watercourse in the UK